Daniel John Mills (born 18 May 1977) is an English former professional footballer best known for his time at Leeds United. His main position was right-back, though he could also play as a centre-back. On 7 August 2009, he announced his retirement from the game at the age of 32 due to an ongoing knee injury.

Club career

Early career
Mills began his career with Norwich City after coming through their youth system. He was unable to establish a regular place in the side and moved to Charlton Athletic in March 1998 and helped them win promotion to the Premier League via the play-offs, playing in their dramatic win over Sunderland in the play-off final, winning 7–6 on penalties after a 4–4 draw.

Leeds United
In June 1999, Mills signed for Leeds United in a £4.1 million transfer. He played a part in helping Leeds reach the 2000-01 UEFA Champions League Semi-final. Mills' Champions League debut came in Leeds' 4–0 defeat by Barcelona at the Nou Camp.

Mills spent the 2003–04 season on loan at Middlesbrough, where he played in the 2004 Football League Cup Final to help Middlesbrough to their first ever major trophy.

Following relegation from the Premier League at the end of 2003–04, Leeds could no longer afford to retain Mills' services, and he moved to Manchester City  on a free transfer in the close season, signing a five-year contract. As part of his severance package with Leeds, Mills continued to receive part of his wages from the Yorkshire club for the duration of his original Leeds contract. Mills often said that he would've liked to go back to Leeds again (along with Olivier Dacourt), but this never materialised. Mills has been seen at Leeds games with his son after the club's relegation to the Football League Championship.

Manchester City
Mills made his Manchester City debut in the opening fixture of the 2004–05 season, a 1–1 draw against Fulham at the City of Manchester Stadium. He started the majority of matches in his first season at Manchester City, but was dropped from the first team when Stuart Pearce replaced Kevin Keegan as manager in March 2005. He regained his place for the start of the 2005–06 season, and on 2 October 2005, he scored his first and only goal for Manchester City, a powerful shot from  against Everton. One month later, he sustained a shin injury which resulted in a fifteen-game absence. The injury coincided with the emergence of Micah Richards who deposed him as first choice right-back; after Richards made his debut, Mills made only five further first team appearances in the remainder of the season.

On 14 September 2006 he joined Hull City in a two-month loan deal. He returned to Manchester City in January and was on the verge of being sent on loan to Hull City again or Leeds United, but a decision was made to keep him at City. Following the appointment of Sven-Göran Eriksson as Manchester City manager, Mills was transfer listed for loan. He re-joined former club Charlton on a loan deal until the end of 2007.

He joined Premier League strugglers Derby County on loan, in January 2008 until 2 May. However, he was injured in only his second game for the Rams, returning to City shortly after. On 1 July 2009, he was released by Manchester City after his contract finally expired. On 7 August 2009 Mills announced his retirement from all football during an appearance on BBC Five Live.

International career
Following a series of impressive performances for Leeds United, Mills received his first England callup in 2001, making his international debut on 25 May 2001, as a substitute in a friendly against Mexico at Pride Park. His first England start came on 27 March 2002 in a friendly against Italy. At the 2002 FIFA World Cup, Mills was chosen as England's first choice right-back following an injury to Gary Neville, and he played every minute of England's five matches.

Outside football
Mills is a patron of Shine (formerly the Association for Spina Bifida And Hydrocephalus), and has raised money for the charity since the death of his son Archie from the condition in 2002. He has also appeared on BBC Five Live's Fighting Talk. Mills now acts as a regular pundit and commentator (often alongside Alan Green) for BBC Radio Five Live's coverage of the Premier League, League Cup, FA Cup, UEFA Champions League and England national football team matches.

In 2010, he competed in the Brighton Marathon in a wheelchair to raise money for Shine and the National Association of Disabled Supporters, completing the race in two hours, 43 minutes.

Mills was a runner up, along with Michael Underwood, on the 2012 series of Celebrity MasterChef. He was beaten by Emma Kennedy in a closely contested final.

In 2016, he ran the London Marathon for The Bobby Moore Fund, finishing in a time of 3hours 14mins 46secs.... he had previously run the Yorkshire Marathon for the Jane Tomlinson Appeal in 3hours 17mins.

Personal life
His son George Mills won the 1500 metres British title in athletics. His younger son Stanley is a professional footballer for Everton.

Career statistics

Club

International

Honours
Middlesbrough
League Cup: 2003–04

References

External links

 
 Ex-canaries.co.uk archives bio

Footballers from Norwich
1977 births
Living people
English footballers
England youth international footballers
England under-21 international footballers
England international footballers
Association football defenders
Norwich City F.C. players
Charlton Athletic F.C. players
Leeds United F.C. players
Middlesbrough F.C. players
Manchester City F.C. players
Hull City A.F.C. players
Derby County F.C. players
English Football League players
Premier League players
2002 FIFA World Cup players
English association football commentators